Goodbye Country (Hello Nightclub) is the third studio album by the English electronica duo Groove Armada. It was released on 10 September 2001 on the Jive Electro record label. The title of the album was meant to differentiate it from the band's previous album, Vertigo, as being more upbeat and less chill-out.

The album features several guest vocalists, including Jeru the Damaja in "Suntoucher", MC M.A.D. in "Superstylin'", Tim Hutton in "Drifted", "Tuning In" and "Join Hands", Richie Havens in "Little by Little" and "Healing", Celetia Martin in "My Friend", and Kriminul in "Raisin' the Stakes". The Urban Soul Orchestra appears in "Edge Hill". The chorus from "Bam Bam" by Sister Nancy is sampled in "Fogma".

The track "Likwid" is a bonus track available only in the enhanced edition. A limited edition of the album was released with a bonus CD titled Socks, Cigarettes and Shipwrecks.

Track listing 

 Socks, Cigarettes and Shipwrecks

Charts

Weekly charts

Year-end charts

Certifications

References

External links 
 

2001 albums
Groove Armada albums
Jive Records albums